The South Carolina Gamecocks softball team represents the University of South Carolina in NCAA Division I college softball.  The team joined the Southeastern Conference in 1997 when the conference began to sponsor the sport.  Prior to 1997, the team competed as an independent.  Home games are played at Beckham Field, which sits adjacent to Sarge Frye Field.  The softball team has won three SEC titles and participated in eleven Women's College World Series.  At the end of the 2014 regular season, their all-time record is 1,334–709–6 (.569).

Head coaches

Year-by-year results

South Carolina Gamecock's Louisville Slugger/NFCA All-Americans

See also
List of NCAA Division I softball programs

References

External links